Cotalpa conclamara, the Texas goldsmith beetle, is a species of shining leaf chafer in the family Scarabaeidae.

References

Further reading

 
 

Rutelinae
Articles created by Qbugbot
Beetles described in 2002